This list is about the Sierra Nevada of California, United States.

Principal mountains

List of mountains over 14,000 ft (4250 m) with 300 ft (90 m) of prominence:

 Mount Whitney 14,505 ft (4421 m)
 Mount Williamson 14,403 ft (4390 m)
 North Palisade 14,242 ft (4341 m)
 Mount Sill 14,153 ft (4314 m)
 Mount Russell 14,094 ft (4296 m)
 Split Mountain 14,064 ft (4286 m)
 Mount Langley 14,025 ft (4280 m)
 Mount Tyndall 14,019 ft (4273 m)
 Middle Palisade 14,012 ft (4271 m)
 Mount Muir 14,012 ft (4271 m)

Other notable peaks:

 Mount Baxter
 Black Kaweah
 Castle Peak
 Cathedral Peak
 Johnson Peak, the highest mountain in Tuolumne Meadows
 El Capitan
 Mount Conness
 Mount Dana
 Mount Darwin
 Mount Davis
 Fresno Dome
 Mount Gibbs
 Half Dome
 Mount Hopkins
 Mount Humphreys
 Mount Huntington
 Lembert Dome
 Liberty Cap
 Mount Lyell
 Maggies Peaks
 Mammoth Mountain
 Matterhorn Peak
 The Minarets
 Mount Morgan
 Mount Morrison
 Pyramid Peak
 Red Kaweah
 Red Slate Mountain
 Mount Ritter
 Shuteye Peak
 Thunderbolt Peak
 Mount Tom

Subranges

 Carson Range
 Cathedral Range
 Clark Range
 Crystal Range
 Great Western Divide
 Kaweah Peaks Ridge
 Palisades
 Ritter Range
 Sherwin Range

Counties in the Sierra 

 Alpine County, California
 Amador County, California
 Butte County, California
 Calaveras County, California
 El Dorado County, California
 Fresno County, California
 Inyo County, California
 Kern County, California
 Madera County, California
 Mariposa County, California
 Mono County, California
 Nevada County, California
 Placer County, California
 Plumas County, California
 Sierra County, California
 Tulare County, California
 Tuolumne County, California
 Yuba County, California
The Carson Range (a spur of the Sierra) extends into Nevada:
 Douglas County, Nevada
 Carson City, Nevada
 Washoe County, Nevada

Principal rivers 

 American River
 Cosumnes River
 Feather River
 Kern River
 Kings River
 Merced River
 Mokelumne River
 Sacramento River
 San Joaquin River
 Stanislaus River
 Truckee River
 Tuolumne River
 Yuba River

Prominent Lakes

 Lake Tahoe
 Beardsley Lake
 Cherry Lake
 Mono Lake
 New Melones Lake
 Pinecrest Lake
 Tioga Lake
 Tulloch Lake
 Twain Harte Lake

Other natural features 

 Devil's Postpile
 Grand Canyon of the Tuolumne River
 Hetch Hetchy Valley
 Kings Canyon
 Long Valley Caldera
 Owens Valley
 San Joaquin Valley
 Sacramento Valley
 Tuolumne Meadows
 Yosemite Valley
 List of waterfalls in Yosemite National Park

National parks and monuments

North to south:
 Yosemite National Park
 Kings Canyon National Park
 Sequoia National Park
 Giant Sequoia National Monument
Eastern side of the Sierra:
 Devil's Postpile National Monument

National forests 

 Eldorado National Forest
 Humboldt-Toiyabe National Forest
 Inyo National Forest
 Lake Tahoe Basin Management Unit
 Plumas National Forest
 Sequoia National Forest
 Sierra National Forest
 Stanislaus National Forest
 Tahoe National Forest

Wilderness areas 

 Ansel Adams
 Bright Star
 Bucks Lake
 Carson-Iceberg
 Chimney Peak
 Desolation
 Dinkey Lakes
 Domeland
 Emigrant
 Golden Trout
 Granite Chief
 Hoover
 Jennie Lakes
 John Krebs
 John Muir
 Kaiser
 Kiavah
 Mokelumne
 Monarch
 Mount Rose
 Owens Peak
 Owens River Headwaters
 Sacatar Trail
 Sequoia-Kings Canyon
 South Sierra
 Yosemite

State Parks

California 

 Auburn State Recreation Area
 Bodie State Historic Park
 Burton Creek State Park
 Calaveras Big Trees State Park
 California State Mining and Mineral Museum Park Property
 Columbia State Historic Park
 D. L. Bliss State Park
 Donner Memorial State Park
 Emerald Bay State Park
 Empire Mine State Historic Park
 Folsom Lake State Recreation Area
 Folsom Powerhouse State Historic Park
 Grover Hot Springs State Park
 Indian Grinding Rock State Historic Park
 Kings Beach State Recreation Area
 Lake Valley State Recreation Area
 Malakoff Diggins State Historic Park
 Marshall Gold Discovery State Historic Park
 Millerton Lake State Recreation Area
 Mono Lake Tufa State Reserve
 Prairie City State Vehicular Recreation Area
 Railtown 1897 State Historic Park
 South Yuba River State Park
 Stone Lake Park Property
 Sugar Pine Point Light
 Tahoe State Recreation Area
 Ward Creek Park Property
 Washoe Meadows State Park
 Wassama Round House State Historic Park

Nevada 
 Dayton State Park
 Lake Tahoe-Nevada State Park
 Mormon Station State Historic Park
 Washoe Lake State Park

Trails and routes 
 John Muir Trail
 Pacific Crest Trail
 Tahoe Rim Trail
 High Sierra Trail
 Sierra High Route

Giant sequoia

 Converse Basin Grove
 Boole (tree)
 General Sherman (tree)
 General Grant (tree)
 General Noble (tree)
 Giant Forest
 President (tree)
 Lincoln (tree)
 Nelder Grove
 Mariposa Grove
 Mark Twain (tree)
 Stagg (tree)
 Redwood Mountain Grove

Mountain passes

 Carson Pass
 Ebbetts Pass
 Forester Pass
 Fredonyer Pass
 Glen Pass
 Morgan Summit
 Muir Pass
 Pacific Grade Summit
 Sherman Pass
 Sonora Pass
 Tehachapi Pass
 Tioga Pass
 Walker Pass

Fires

 Cedar Fire (2003)
 Rim Fire (2013)
 Thomas Fire (2017)
 Mendocino Complex (2018)
 August Complex fire (2020)
 North Complex Fire (2020)
 LNU Lightning Complex fires (2020)
 SCU Lightning Complex fires (2020)
 SQF Complex (2020)
 Creek Fire (2020)
 Caldor Fire (2021)
 Dixie Fire (2021)
 Oak Fire (2022)
 Washburn Fire (2022)

People related to the Sierra Nevada 

 Ansel Adams
 Lafayette Bunnell
 Kit Carson
 Galen Clark
 Norman Clyde
 C.C. Curtis
 Francis P. Farquhar
 James Mason Hutchings
 Joseph LeConte
 Joseph Nisbet LeConte
 John Muir
 Jim Savage
 Carl Sharsmith
 Theodore Solomons
 Walter A. Starr, Jr.
 Chief Tenaya
 Snowshoe Thompson
 Josiah Whitney

Relevant list articles
 List of first ascents in the Sierra Nevada (U.S.)
 List of Sierra Nevada road passes
 List of Yosemite destinations

See also
Bibliography of the Sierra Nevada

References

Sierra Nevada
Sierra Nevada
Topics